Ákos Tolnay (1903–1981) was a Hungarian screenwriter active mainly in Italian cinema, having previously worked in Britain. He also appeared in Roberto Rossellini's 1945 neorealist film Rome, Open City.

Selected filmography
 The Scandal (1934)
 Temptation (1934)
 Drake of England (1935)
 The Avenging Hand (1936)
 Ball at Savoy (1936)
 Second Bureau (1936)
 Wings Over Africa (1936)
 Elephant Boy (1937)
 Return of a Stranger (1937)
 Thunder in the City (1937)
 The Wife of General Ling (1937)
 The White Slave (1939)
 The Brambilla Family Go on Holiday (1941)
 Caravaggio, il pittore maledetto (1941)
 Two Hearts Among the Beasts (1943)
 Tehran (1946)
 Call of the Blood (1948)
 Golden Madonna (1949)
 Voice of Silence (1953)
 A Parisian in Rome (1954)
 The Open Door (1957)
 The White Warrior (1959)

References

Bibliography
 Christopher Wagstaff. Italian Neorealist Cinema: An Aesthetic Approach. University of Toronto Press, 2007.

External links

1903 births
1981 deaths
Hungarian male film actors
Hungarian film producers
People from Szeged
Hungarian emigrants to Italy
20th-century Hungarian screenwriters